The knockout stage of the 2019 Africa Cup of Nations was the second and final stage of the competition, following the group stage. It began on 5 July with the round of 16 and ended on 19 July 2019 with the final, held at the Cairo International Stadium in Cairo. A total of 16 teams (the top two teams from each group, along with the four best third-placed teams) advanced to the knockout stage to compete in a single-elimination style tournament.

All match times are local, CAT (UTC+2).

Format
In the knockout stage, except for the third place play-off, if a match was level at the end of 90 minutes of normal playing time, extra time was played (two periods of 15 minutes each). If still tied after extra time, the match was decided by a penalty shoot-out to determine the winner. In the third place play-off, if the scores remain level after 90 minutes the match would go directly to a penalty shoot-out, without any extra time being played.

CAF set out the following schedule for the round of 16:
 Match 37: Winner Group B v 3rd Group A/C/D
 Match 38: Runner-up Group A v Runner-up Group C
 Match 39: Winner Group A v 3rd Group C/D/E
 Match 40: Winner Group C v 3rd Group A/B/F
 Match 41: Winner Group D v 3rd Group B/E/F
 Match 42: Runner-up Group B v Runner-up Group F
 Match 43: Winner Group E v Runner-up Group D
 Match 44: Winner Group F v Runner-up Group E

Combinations of matches in the round of 16

The specific match-ups involving the third-placed teams depended on which four third-placed teams qualified for the round of 16:

Qualified teams
The top two placed teams from each of the six groups, plus the four best-placed third teams, qualified for the knockout stage.

Bracket

Round of 16

Morocco vs Benin

Uganda vs Senegal

Nigeria vs Cameroon

Egypt vs South Africa

Madagascar vs DR Congo

Algeria vs Guinea

Mali vs Ivory Coast

Ghana vs Tunisia

Quarter-finals

Senegal vs Benin

Nigeria vs South Africa

Ivory Coast vs Algeria

Madagascar vs Tunisia

Semi-finals

Senegal vs Tunisia

Algeria vs Nigeria

Third place play-off

Final

References

External links
 

2019 Africa Cup of Nations